Paradesi or Poongothai is a 1953 Indian Telugu-Tamil bilingual romance film, produced by P. Adinarayana Rao under the Anjali pictures banner and directed by L. V. Prasad. It stars Akkineni Nageswara Rao, Anjali Devi, Sivaji Ganesan and music also composed by P. Adinarayana Rao. The film is a remake of the Hindi movie Raj Rani (1950). No print of Poongothai is known to survive, making it a lost film.

Plot synopsis
Chandram and Lakshmi who fall in love with each other, consummate their love but are separated by fate. They reunite after a few years and the cause for their reunion makes the rest of the story.

Cast
Akkineni Nageswara Rao as Chandram
Anjali Devi as Lakshmi
S. V. Ranga Rao as Rangadu
Ganesan as Anand
Janardhan
Relangi as Devaiah
Pandari Bai as Susheela
Suryakantham as Srugaram
K. A. Thangavelu (Tamil)
Vasantha as Taara
Anasuya as Bangaram
Master Mohan as Anand

Soundtrack
Telugu

Music composed by P. Adinarayana Rao. Lyrics were written by Malladi Venkata Krishna Sharma. Music released on Audio Company. 

Tamil
One song Thayagamey Vaazhka, was written by Bharathidasan and all others were penned by Kambadasan. Playback singers are A. M. Rajah, D. B. Ramachandran, Chellamuthu, V. N. Sundaram, Jikki and A. P. Komala.

Production
After splitting out from Aswini Pictures, Anjali Devi and her husband Adinarayana Rao formed their own production house and named it Anjali Pictures. They decided to remake Raj Rani, a 1950 Hindi film directed by Satish Nigam and bought the rights. They decided to shoot the film in two languages—Tamil and Telugu, and appointed L. V. Prasad as the director. Prasad, however, did not make a direct copy of the Hindi original; he made subtle changes to the screenplay to suit the audience. The producers were looking for a new actor to play the second lead role. P. A. Perumal Chettiar, a leading film distributor suggested Sivaji Ganesan to Anjali Devi and her husband. Ganesan, who was a prominent theatre artist acquired the prefix "Sivaji" after he played Chatrapati Shivaji in a stage play. Ganesan was immediately chosen for the role and had a screen test for the first time. It was during this time that Parasakthi was made. Perumal, the film's producer made a request to Anjali Devi that Parasakthi be released before Paradesi. Anjali and Rao, the producers agreed and hence Parasakthi became Ganesan's first released film.

Sakthi Krishnaswamy wrote the dialogues while Bharathidasan and Kambadasan wrote the lyrics for the Tamil film Poongodhai.

Reception
The film released on 14 January 1953. Both the versions did well in the run. The Tamil version Poongodhai received positive response from the critics.

In November 2013, M. L. Narasimham of The Hindu noted that the film would be "remembered as the launch pad for Sivaji Ganesan". Film critic and Telugu film director K. N. T. Sastry in his L.V. Prasad: a monograph described, "Paradesi is about urbanites" and not the conventional village-based subject. He also noted that the screenplay was very fast.

Notes

References

External links
 

1953 films
Incest in film
1950s Tamil-language films
1950s Telugu-language films
Tamil remakes of Hindi films
Telugu remakes of Hindi films
Indian multilingual films
Films directed by L. V. Prasad
Lost Indian films
1950s multilingual films
Indian romance films
1950s romance films
Indian black-and-white films